On October 4, 1982, Annette Cooper, 18, and Todd Schultz, 19, both of Logan, Ohio, who were engaged, went missing. Their dismembered bodies were recovered two weeks later in the Hocking River and a cornfield in West Logan. Both had been shot before being dismembered.

Cooper's stepfather, Dale Johnston, was arrested in 1983, convicted, and sentenced to death by a three-judge panel in 1984. Johnston was later retried and found not guilty, and in 2008 two other men, including Chester McKnight, confessed to the killings and dismemberments. In 2012 Johnston was declared innocent. In 2020 Johnston received a settlement of $775,000 from the state of Ohio.

Background 
Annette Cooper, her mother Sarah, sister Michelle, and stepfather Dale Johnston moved from Xenia, Ohio, to a farm outside Logan, Ohio, in the 1970s.

Disappearance and discovery of the bodies 
On October 4, 1982, Annette Cooper, 18, a Hocking College student, and Todd Schultz, 19, both of Logan, Ohio, who were engaged, went missing. Their torsos were recovered on October 14 in the Hocking River and their heads and limbs on October 16 in several shallow graves in a cornfield in West Logan approximately a mile from where the couple had last been seen. Both had been shot before being dismembered.

Investigation 
Cooper's stepfather, Dale Johnston, had been known to be opposed to the couple's engagement. Rumors had spread that Johnston had molested Annette; these were denied by Johnston, Sarah, and Michelle.

Logan police and prosecutors focused on Johnston as their primary suspect immediately, although there were reliable witnesses whose accounts disputed their theory of the crime, which was that Johnston had killed and dismembered the couple at the Johnston farm, then bagged the body parts and transported them to the river and the cornfield.

Arrest and trial of Dale Johnston 
Johnston was arrested in September of 1983. He was tried before a panel of three judges, including Joseph Cirigliano of Lorain County and Michael Corrigan of Cuyahoga County, with James E. Stillwell of Hocking County presiding. 

The prosecution's theory was that Johnston was in love with his stepdaughter and killed her and her fiance in a jealous rage. The prosecution failed to disclose the testimony of witnesses who could have placed the murder at the cornfield, rather than at the Johnston farm, and the panel allowed evidence that had been obtained through hypnosis to be presented.

The panel convicted Johnston in March of 1984 and sentenced him to death. His execution was scheduled for October 4, 1984. In June of 1984, a stay was granted.

Second trial 
In October of 1988, the Ohio Supreme Court ordered a new trial based on evidence the prosecution had withheld and improper admittance of testimony that should not have been allowed. The decision, written by Ralph S. Locker, said the Johnston's rights had been violated by the prosecution's decision to withhold exculpatory information from the defense.

In 1990 the Franklin County Court of Appeals ruled that much of the evidence presented in the first trial could not be used in the second trial, and the case was dismissed. Johnston was released in May of 1990. Many in Logan still believed him guilty.

2008 arrests 
In September 2008, two men confessed to the crime and were arrested. 

In December of 2008, Chester McKnight pled guilty and received two life sentences.  

Kenneth Linscott of Logan pled guilty to misdemeanor abuse of a corpse, received time served, and was released. 

Rape or intended rape and escaping detection for those crimes were specified as motives for the murders in the indictment.

Wrongful conviction suits, ruling of innocence and settlement 
After his 1990 release, Johnston filed his initial wrongful conviction and imprisonment claim. The Hocking County court denied it in 1993, ruling that the preponderance of evidence did not prove Johnston innocent.

In 2003, legislation brought by Ohio Representative Bill Seitz was passed to amend Ohio's wrongful imprisonment statute.

In 2012, a Franklin County, Ohio, judge ruled Johnston innocent, allowing him to sue the state for damages. Then-Ohio Attorney General Mike DeWine appealed, and the decision that allowed Johnston to seek compensation from the state was reversed. 

In March of 2014 Franklin County Court of Appeals ruled that the 2003 legislation change did not operate retroactively. Johnston appealed. In February of 2014, Mansaray vs. State found that the 2003 statute amendment should be interpreted to limit claims to only those errors in procedure occurring after a sentence has been passed. In 2015, the Ohio Supreme Court reversed the decision, ruling that the legislation can be applied retroactively, and ordered the court of appeals to reconsider Johnston's case. 

A new trial again found Johnston innocent, but in 2016 the Franklin County Court of Appeals again overturned the right to seek compensation, citing Mansaray. In 2017 the Ohio Supreme Court declined to hear Johnston's appeal.

In 2017 DeWine opposed legislation that would allow Johnston to seek damages from the state. In 2019 that legislation was passed and overset Mansaray's limitations in cases of a Brady violation; it was signed into law by John Kasich in December of 2017, the month before DeWine would have taken office as Ohio governor.

In 2020, the state of Ohio settled with Johnston for $775,000.

Analysis 
Akron Beacon-Journal reporter Bill Osinski, who covered the case from the first trial, said there was "an astounding lack of physical evidence" but that local opinion had influenced the trial; because Johnston was considered an outsider, he was convicted in popular opinion, which influenced the panel of three judges. Witness to Innocence categorized the factors in the wrongful conviction as involving mistaken witness identification, false or misleading forensic evidence, and prosecutorial misconduct.

References

Further reading 

 

Wrongful convictions
1982 murders in the United States